The 2002 Skyrunner World Series was the 1st edition of the global skyrunning competition, Skyrunner World Series, organised by the International Skyrunning Federation from 2002.

Results
The World Cup has developed in 7 races from July to October.

Final ranking
The final ranking of the Championship is done by summing up the four best scores in the World Circuit races. In the event of a former victory, the score is divided and in the case of the same score in the circuit, who has won more victories.

Men

Women

References

External links
 Skyrunner World Series

2002